inland rock gecko may refer to the two African gecko species below:

Afroedura karroica
Afroedura halli